Vivian Juanita Malone Jones (July 15, 1942 – October 13, 2005) was one of the first two black students to enroll at the University of Alabama in 1963, and in 1965 became the university's first black graduate. She was made famous when George Wallace, the Governor of Alabama, attempted to block her and James Hood from enrolling at the all-white university.

Early life
Malone was born in Mobile, Mobile County, Alabama in 1942, the fourth of eight children. Her parents both worked at Brookley Air Force Base; her father served in maintenance and her mother worked as a domestic servant. Her parents emphasized the importance of receiving an education and made sure that their children attended college. Each of Malone's older brothers attended Tuskegee University. Her parents were also active in civil rights and often participated in local meetings, donations, and activities in the community that promoted equality and desegregation. As a teenager, Malone was often involved in community organizations to end racial discrimination and worked closely with local leaders of the movements to work for desegregation in schools.

Malone attended Central High School, where she was a member of the National Honor Society. In February 1961, she enrolled in Alabama Agricultural and Mechanical University, one of the few colleges for black students in the state. She attended Alabama A&M for two years and received a bachelor's degree in business education.  Malone had wanted to pursue a degree in accounting, a field of study not offered by Alabama A&M at the time. Moreover, the bachelor's degree Malone received was issued to her before the university had been fully accredited by the Southern Association of Colleges and Schools. To earn an accredited degree in accounting, Malone would have to transfer to another university.

University of Alabama

In 1961, Malone had received word from a family friend that the local Non-Partisan Voter League had organized a plan to desegregate the University of Alabama's branch school in Mobile. Due to her exceptional performance in high school, Malone was one out of a number of local black students the organization suggested apply to the Mobile campus. At least 200 black students had applied to the university only to have their applications rejected. The university denied admission to the applicants on the grounds of over-enrollment and closed enrollment, the quotas already being filled or the academic performance of the students not meeting required standards; however, it had become understood by the community that the university would not admit the black students because of resistance to school desegregation.

Black students who had applied to the university's branch campus in Mobile were investigated by the university's department of Public Safety, including Malone. After applying to the Mobile branch of the University of Alabama, Malone and her family had been visited by two white men who had claimed that they were representatives of the state. They disclosed that her attempts to apply to the Mobile campus and integrate with the school had instigated violent retaliation from the local white community from which the family would not receive much protection. The threat to her safety did not deter Malone from continuing to support integration in the university and she persisted in applying to the University of Alabama to earn a degree in accounting.

The NAACP Legal Defense and Educational Fund of Alabama organized an opportunity with Malone to enroll her in the University of Alabama's School of Commerce and Business Administration to earn her accounting degree. The Legal Defense Fund had been working closely with a student, James Hood, to desegregate the University of Alabama. After two years of deliberation and court proceedings, Malone and Hood were granted permission to enroll in the university by order of District Court Judge Harlan Grooms in 1963. The district court had ruled that the University of Alabama's practice of denying black students admission into their university was a violation of the U.S. Supreme Court's ruling in the Brown v. Board of Education case, in which the act of educating black children in schools intentionally separated from white students was charged as unconstitutional. Judge Grooms had also forbidden Governor George Wallace from interfering with the students' registration.

On June 11, 1963, Malone and Hood, accompanied by United States Deputy Attorney General Nicholas Katzenbach and a three-car motorcade full of federal marshals, arrived at the University of Alabama's campus with the intention to enroll. Waiting for them on campus and blocking the entryway to Foster Auditorium was Governor Wallace, flanked by a group of state troopers. Wallace intended to keep true to his promise of upholding segregation in the state and stopping "integration at the schoolhouse door". As Malone and Hood waited in a car, Deputy Attorney General Katzenbach and a small team of federal marshals confronted Wallace to demand that Malone and Hood be allowed entry by order of the federal court and for Wallace to step aside.

Wallace had not only refused the order, but he interrupted Katzenbach; in front of the crowds of media crews surrounding him, Wallace delivered a short, symbolic speech concerning state sovereignty, claiming:"The unwelcomed, unwanted, unwarranted and force-induced intrusion upon the campus of the University of Alabama ... of the might of the Central Government offers frightful example of the oppression of the rights, privileges and sovereignty of this State by officers of the Federal Government."After seeing that Wallace would not step aside, Katzenbach called upon the assistance of President John F. Kennedy to force Wallace to permit the black students' entry into the university. Katzenbach took Malone up to her dormitory and told her to see her room and eat lunch alone in the dining room if she became hungry. Malone went downstairs into the dining room, and was surprised to be joined by several white students, who ate lunch with her. She remained in the dormitory until the situation was determined to have calmed down.

President John F. Kennedy federalized the Alabama National Guard later the same day, which put them under the command of the president, rather than the governor of Alabama. One hundred guardsmen escorted Malone and Hood from their dorms back to the auditorium, where Wallace moved aside at the request of General Henry V. Graham.  Malone and Hood then entered the building, albeit through another door. As she and Hood entered the building, they were met with surprising applause from white supporters of integration.  They then entered the gym and registered as students of the university, with Malone being accepted into the university as a junior.

Malone's time spent at the University of Alabama was relatively free of conflict and threats to her safety, with the exception of a spree of bombings that occurred in November 1963 by rioting whites possibly angry with the integration policy. After much deliberation between the U.S. Marshal and Katzenbach, it was decided that Malone would not be taken out of school or unenrolled because of the bombings. Two years later, in 1965, she received a Bachelor of Arts in business management and became the first black student to graduate from the University of Alabama. She graduated with a B-plus average.

Later life
Despite her university achievements, she did not receive any job offers in Alabama. She later joined the civil rights division of the U.S. Department of Justice and served as a research analyst. While in Washington, she attended George Washington University and pursued a master's degree in public administration. She took a job as an employee relations specialist at the central office of the United States Veteran's Administration. During her time in Washington, she attended the signing of the Voting Rights Act of 1965. 

She was appointed to a position as the Executive Director of the Voter Education Project in August 1977 and worked towards voter equality for minorities. In this role, she helped provide assistance and funds to local voter registration projects. She also helped in the piloting of Project 23, a program aimed at addressing the barriers that kept Black individuals in the state of Georgia from registering to vote or running for public office. By 1978, the Voter Education project had assisted in the voter registration of about 3 million Black individuals. She later became the Director of Civil Rights and Urban Affairs and Director of Environmental Justice for the U.S. Environmental Protection Agency, a position she held until her retirement in 1996. Upon her retirement, she began to sell life insurance. In October 1996, Jones was chosen by the George Wallace Family Foundation to be the first recipient of its Lurleen B. Wallace Award of Courage. At the ceremony, Wallace said, "Vivian Malone Jones was at the center of the fight over states' rights and conducted herself with grace, strength and, above all, courage." In 2000, Jones gave the commencement address at the University of Alabama, and the university bestowed on her a doctorate of humane letters. Additionally, in 2004, the Alabama State Legislature honored her by passing a resolution in commemoration of her outstanding achievements.

Personal life
Jones was married to Mack Arthur Jones, an obstetrician, who predeceased her in 2004. She first met Jones when he was hired as her driver at the University of Alabama. She was a member of From the Heart Christian Ministries of Atlanta where she served as an usher. Her brother-in-law Eric Holder served as U.S. Attorney General. Her nephew Jeff Malone was an All-American basketball student-athlete at Mississippi State University and NBA standout.

Jones died following a stroke at age 63 on October 13, 2005, in an Atlanta hospital. Her funeral services were held at the Martin Luther King Jr. International Chapel at Morehouse College. Jones had a son, a daughter, three grandchildren, four sisters, and three brothers.

Legacy

Popular culture 
The arrival of Vivian Malone Jones and James Hood to the University of Alabama, also known as Stand in the Schoolhouse Door, was depicted in the 1994 film Forrest Gump. The main character appeared at the event and handed Jones a book she dropped when walking into Foster Auditorium.

Historical marker and additional honors 
In 2017, a historical marker was installed at the Mobile County Health Department in honor of Jones. It was placed at the location of her childhood home, which is now the parking lot for the Keeler Memorial Building on the Health Department's campus. The marker sits along the Dora Franklin Finley African-American Heritage Trail in Mobile, Alabama.

In 2018, a street in downtown Mobile was named in her honor.

Awards and community impact 
In 2018, JaVaughnae Malone and her mother, Janice, started a nonprofit called Vivian's Door in Mobile, Alabama. With a purpose of fostering minority-owned businesses, Vivian's Door has dedicated itself to providing training, resources, networking opportunities, and customers to local minority businesses in south Alabama. Their initiative was inspired by JaVaughnae's cousin, Vivian Malone Jones. Additionally, the University of Alabama awards a student the Vivian Malone Jones Endowed Scholarship for Diversity each year. In 2014, the Environmental Protection Agency established the Vivian Malone Jones Legacy Award in her honor. Each year, an individual who has demonstrated integrity and consistently contributed to social justice in the Environmental Protection Agency or in the greater community is presented with this award in memoriam of Jones and the legacy of her work.

See also
 The McDonogh Three
 Little Rock Nine
 James Meredith

References

1942 births
2005 deaths
People of the United States Environmental Protection Agency
School desegregation pioneers
University of Alabama alumni
People from Monroe County, Alabama
African-American activists
Trachtenberg School of Public Policy & Public Administration alumni